Zuran or Zooran may refer to:
 Žuráň, a hill in the Czech Republic
 Zuran, Kerman, a village in Iran
 Zuran, West Azerbaijan, a village in Iran